Stormchaser is the fourth studio album by the melodic death metal band Light This City.

Track listing
 "Stormchaser" – 5:25
 "Fragile Heroes" – 4:01
 "The Anhedonia Epidemic" – 4:53
 "Beginning with Release" – 4:54
 "Firehaven" (featuring Chuck Billy of Testament) – 3:35
 "The Collector, Part. 1: Muse" – 3:32
 "The Collector, Part. 2: Donor" (featuring John Strachan of The Funeral Pyre) – 3:43
 "A Desperate Resolution" – 4:33
 "Wake Me at Sunset" – 5:11
 "Bridge to Cross" – 3:30
 "Sand and Snow" - 3:18
 "Self Portrait" - 3:30

Personnel
Laura Nichol - vocals
Ryan Hansen - guitar
Brian Forbes - guitar
Jon Frost - bass guitar
Ben Murray: drums

References

2008 albums
Light This City albums